Edward Joseph Schwartz (March 26, 1912 – March 22, 2000) was a United States district judge of the United States District Court for the Southern District of California.

Education and career

Born in Seattle, Washington, Schwartz received an Artium Baccalaureus degree from the University of California, Berkeley in 1934 and a Juris Doctor from the University of San Francisco School of Law in 1939. He was a Lieutenant Commander in the United States Navy during World War II, from 1942 to 1945, and thereafter served as a United States Naval Reserve Lieutenant Commander. After law school he was in private practice in San Diego, California from 1940 to 1941. He resumed his private practice after servicing in World War II in San Diego from 1946 to 1959. During this time he specialized on business, probate and corporate law. Governor Pat Brown appointed him to the Municipal Court of San Diego in 1959. He was a judge of the Municipal Court of San Diego from 1959 to 1964, and on the Superior Court of San Diego County from 1964 to 1968.

Federal judicial service

On January 29, 1968, Schwartz was nominated by President Lyndon B. Johnson to a seat on the United States District Court for the Southern District of California vacated by Judge James Marshall Carter. Schwartz was confirmed by the United States Senate on March 28, 1968, and received his commission the same day. He served as Chief Judge from 1969 to 1982, assuming senior status on March 26, 1982 and serving in that capacity until his death on March 22, 2000, in San Diego.

Honor

The Edward J. Schwartz United States Courthouse is named in Schwartz's honor.

See also
List of Jewish American jurists

References

Sources
 

1912 births
2000 deaths
Judges of the United States District Court for the Southern District of California
United States district court judges appointed by Lyndon B. Johnson
20th-century American judges
United States Navy officers
20th-century American lawyers
Superior court judges in the United States